The University of Trás-os-Montes and Alto Douro (UTAD; Portuguese: Universidade de Trás-os-Montes e Alto Douro) is a public university located in the north-eastern city of Vila Real, Portugal.

It became a public university in 1986, although its history also includes a heritage received from its predecessor, the Vila Real Polytechnic Institute, created in 1973. This Institute took on a relevant role in the development of the region, and in September 1979, it was converted into the Trás-os-Montes and Alto Douro Higher Education Institute. It was due to the intense activity in the fields of teaching and scientific and technological research that, less than ten years later, the government granted its status as a qualified University.

Organization 
The University of Trás-os-Montes and Alto includes four university schools and one polytechnic school:
School of Agricultural and Veterinary Sciences;
School of Human and Social Sciences;
School of Sciences and Technology;
School of Life and Environmental Sciences;
Vila Real Higher School of Nursing (polytechnic).

Academic programs

Bachelor degrees 
All BAs listed below are at major level. The Portuguese-language title, Licenciatura, indicates that they confer an automatic Licensure for working in a particular profession. In spite of this, some professions may additionally require enrolling in specific professional orders. All engineering, architecture, and medical degrees of the University of Trás-os-Montes and Alto Douro are recognised ("reconhecidos") by these professional orders, and students completing a Bachelor of Arts at this university are exempted from additional examinations for access to those orders. Both university and polytechnic types of degree are awarded in UTAD, however, most are University.

The Nursing degree is given at ESEVR – Nursing School of Vila Real (Escola de Enfermagem de Vila Real).

Sociocultural Leadership (Animação Sociocultural) (Admissions Closed on 2012/2013)
Landscape Architecture (Arquitectura Paisagista)
Bioengineering (Bioengenharia)
Biology (Biologia)
Biology and Geology (Biologia e Geologia)
Biochemistry (Bioquímica)
Food Science (Ciência Alimentar)
Communication Sciences (Ciências da Comunicação)
Sport Sciences (Ciências do Desporto)
Communications and Multimedia (Comunicação e Multimédia)
Applied Ecology (Ecologia Aplicada) (Admissions Closed on 2012/2013)
Economics (Economia)
Elementary Education (Educação Básica)
Physical Education (Educação Física e Desporto Escolar)
Nursing (Enfermagem) (Given at ESEVR)
Agricultural Engineering (Engenharia Agrícola)
Biomedical Engineering (Engenharia Biomédica)
Civil Engineering (Engenharia Civil)
Energy Engineering (Engenharia de Energias)
Human Accessibility and Rehabilitation Engineering (Engenharia de Reabilitação e Acessibilidade Humanas)
Environmental Engineering (Engenharia do Ambiente)
Electrical Engineering (Engenharia Electrotécnica e de Computadores)
Forest Engineering (Engenharia Florestal)
Informatics Engineering (Engenharia Informática)
Mechanical Engineering (Engenharia Mecânica)
Zootechnical Engineering (Engenharia Zootécnica)
Oenology (Enologia)
Genetics and Biotechnology (Genética e Biotecnologia)
Management (Gestão)
Languages and Business Relationships (Línguas e Relações Empresariais)
Languages, Literatures and Cultures (Línguas, Literaturas e Culturas)
Veterinary Medicine (Medicina Veterinária) (Integrated Master – BA+MSc)
Psychology (Psicologia)
Psychomotor Rehabilitation (Reabilitação Psicomotora)
Social Service (Serviço Social)
Theatre and Performing Arts (Teatro e Artes Performativas)
Tourism (Turismo)

Master's degrees 

  Agronomic Engineering  (Engenharia Agronómica)
  Biochemistry  (Bioquímica)
  Bioinformatics and Applications to Life Sciences  (Bioinformática e Aplicações às Ciências da Vida)
  Biomedical Engineering  (Engenharia Biomédica)
  Biotechnology for Health Sciences  (Biotecnologia para as Ciências da Saúde)
  Childhood Education  and  Teaching  of Basic Education, 1st Cycle  (Educação Pré-Escolar e Ensino do 1º Ciclo do Ensino Básico)
  Cities Challenges  (Desafio das Cidades)
  Civil Engineering  (Engenharia Civil)
  Clinical Laboratory Biology  (Biologia Clínica Laboratorial)
  Communication Sciences  (Ciências da Comunicação)
  Community nursing in family health nursing  (Enfermagem Comunitária na Área de Enfermagem de Saúde Familiar)
  Cultural Sciences  (Ciências da Cultura)
  Economic and Management Sciences  (Ciências Económicas e Empresariais)
  Educational Sciences  (Ciências da Educação)
  Electrical and Computing Engineering  (Engenharia Eletrotécnica e de Computadores)
  Environmental Engineering  (Engenharia do Ambiente)
  Food Engineering  (Engenharia Alimentar)
  Forestry Engineering  (Engenharia Florestal)
  Geographic Information Systems  on  Agronomic  and  Forestry Sciences  (Sistemas de Informação Geográfica em Ciências Agronómicas e Florestais)
  Gerontology : Physical Activity and Health in the Elderly (Gerontologia: Atividade Física e Saúde no Idoso)
  Health Care  Services Management (Gestão dos Serviços de Saúde)
  Informatics Engineering  (Engenharia Informática)
  Informatics Engineering  and  Web Technology  (Engenharia Informática e Tecnologia Web)
 International Master in  Performance Analysis of Sport  (Mestrado Internacional em Análise da Performance Desportiva)
  Landscape Architecture  (Arquitetura Paisagista)
  Management  (Gestão)
  Mechanical Engineering  (Engenharia Mecânica)
  Multimedia Technology  (Tecnologia Multimédia)
  Oenology  and  Viticulture  (Enologia e Viticultura)
  Outdoor Sport  Sustainability and   Health  (Desporto de Natureza Sustentabilidade e Saúde)
  Psychology  (Psicologia)
  Social Work  (Serviço Social)
  Sports Sciences  (Ciências do Desporto)
  Teaching  1st CBE and  Mathematics  &  Natural Sciences  in 2nd CBE (Ensino do 1º CEB e de Matemática & Ciências Naturais no 2ºCEB)
  Teaching  of Computer Science (Ensino de Informática)
  Teaching  of  Physical Education  at basic and secondary education levels (Ensino de Educação Física nos Ensinos Básico e Secundário)
  Teaching  on 1st Cycle of  Basic Education  and  Portuguese ,  History  and  Geography  of  Portugal  in the 2nd Cycle of  Basic Education  (Ensino do 1º CEB e Português, História e Geografia de Portugal no 2º CEB)
  Technologic, Comparative and Molecular Genetics  (Genética Molecular Comparativa e Tecnológica)
  Zootechnical Engineering  (Engenharia Zootécnica)

Doctoral degrees 

Computer and Electrical Engineering (Engenharia Electrotécnica e de Computadores)
Technology and Comparative Molecular Genetics (Genética Molecular Comparativa e Tecnológica)
Computer Science (Informática)

Post-baccalaureate studies 

Special Education (Pós-Licenciatura em Educação Especial)

Postgraduate studies 

Management of Theme Routes (Pós-Gradução em Gestão de Rotas Temáticas)
Translation Studies (Pós-Gradução em Tradução)

See also 
List of universities and colleges in Portugal
Higher education in Portugal

Notes

References

External links 

1986 establishments in Portugal
Buildings and structures in Vila Real District
Chaves, Portugal
Educational institutions established in 1986
Mirandese language
Public universities
Universities in Portugal
Veterinary schools
Vila Real, Portugal
Veterinary medicine in Portugal